Joseph Blackburn is an American former ice hockey goaltender who was an All-American for Michigan State.

Career
Blackburn's college career began in the fall of 1997. As a freshman he served as the backup goaltender for Michigan State, playing behind Chad Alban. He saw limited time behind Alban, who finished the year as the runner-up for the Hobey Baker Award, but performed well in his few appearances. After Alban graduated, Blackburn won the starting job and posted even better number than Alban. He took some time off around Christmas to play with the US national team at the World Junior Championships. He played alright in relief, with both games he was credited with, but couldn't help the team finish better than 8th.

Back in East Lansing, his stellar year saw him earn All-American honors while he backstopped MSU to a regular season CCHA championship and a #3 ranking. He helped the Spartans win their first tournament game, breaking a streak of six consecutive losses, and reach the Frozen Four. Despite Blackburn seemingly having a lock on the Spartans' net, one of the top goaltending prospects in the country, Ryan Miller, had already committed to Michigan State (as had many Miller family members before him). Blackburn ended up sharing the goal with Miller during his junior season. While Blackburn's numbers declined, they were still good. Miller, however, put up one of the best goaltending performances by a freshman, leading the nation in goals against average and putting up 8 shutouts in just 26 games. There was little surprise when Blackburn was relegated to spot duty during his senior season while Miller went on to become just the second goaltender to take home the Hobey Baker Award.

Blackburn's playing career ended when he graduated, however, he remained with the game as a volunteer assistant for the Spartans. While working in that capacity, he enrolled in the School of Labor and Industrial Relations and earned an MS in 2003.

After his six years at Michigan State, Blackburn embarked on a career in human resources, working for both General Electric and PepsiCo. Currently he's the vice president of human resources for the Community Health Center in Middletown, Connecticut (as of 2021).

Statistics

Regular season and playoffs

International

Awards and honors

References

External links

1979 births
Living people
AHCA Division I men's ice hockey All-Americans
American men's ice hockey goaltenders
Ice hockey people from Michigan
People from Livonia, Michigan
Michigan State Spartans men's ice hockey players